Ad Nauseam is the second studio album by the British death metal band The Rotted. It was released on 31 October 2011 on Candlelight Records.

Track listing

Personnel
Ben McCrow – vocals
Tim Carley – guitar
Nate Gould – drums
Reverend Trudgill - bass

References

2011 albums
The Rotted albums
Candlelight Records albums